A.T.B.A.N Klann (A Tribe Beyond a Nation) was a hip hop group whose members were Will 1X, apl.de.ap, Mooky Mook, and DJ Motiv8. The Atban Klann were signed to Eazy-E's Ruthless Records. Will 1X (who later changed his stage name to will.i.am) and apl.de.ap were first signed by Eazy-E when they were in high school and would later become members of The Black Eyed Peas.

History

The group was signed to Ruthless Records in 1992 and made their debut on Eazy-E's EP, 5150: Home 4 tha Sick on the track entitled "Merry Muthaphuckkin' Xmas".  Soon after, the group recorded their debut album, Grass Roots which was to be released on October 6, 1994; however, the album was shelved shortly before its release, and shortly after being jailed for 6 weeks in early 1995 on a domestic assault charge, Mookie Mook would leave after an argument. The duo would stay with Ruthless until they were dropped from the label after Eazy-E's death in 1995. Will 1X would change his name to will.i.am and the Atban Klann would add Taboo and later Fergie  and become the Grammy award winning band, The Black Eyed Peas.

Discography

Singles
1994: Puddles Of H2O

Studio album

Grass Roots was originally planned for release at the end of 1993 for Ruthless Records, distributed by Relativity Records; however, the album was put on hold. In 1994, the group released the first single from the album, "Puddles of H2O", as a CD single and promotional twelve-inch, with the B-side single "Let Me Get Down". However, with the band being dropped from Ruthless in 1995 it was not released at that time. The songs from the album later leaked and a cover was made using a photo of apl.de.ap and will.i.am from the Bridging the Gap photo-shoot in 2000. It was then remastered and released properly for the first time on vinyl in 2020 by Back 2 Da Source Records, which sold out.

Track listing
 "Open Your Mind"
 "Put On Your Adidas"
 "Goin for a Ride"
 "Mountain Top" (feat. Dante Santiago and Mr. Shaw)
 "L.A. Borrio Woman Beater"
 "Lord of the Flies" (feat. Huck Finn) 
 "No Sequel"
 "Focus on You" (feat. Dante Santiago and Dandilion)
 "Quid Pro Quo"
 "World's Gone Mad" (feat. Longevity)
 "Strollin"
 "This Is Dedicated" (feat. Dandilion and Mr. Shaw)
 "Let Me Get Down" (feat. Mr. Shaw) 
 "Duet" (feat. Dante Santiago and Dandilion)
 "Puddles of H2O"
 "Rain on Me"
 "Eyougodah"

Personnel
A.T.B.A.N. Klann
Will 1X - vocals
apl.de.ap - vocals
Mooky Mook - vocals
DJ Motiv8 - turntables

Featured Artists 
Dante Santiago - vocals
Mr Shaw - vocals
Dandillion - vocals
Huck Finn - vocals
Longevity - vocals

References 

Hip hop groups from California
Musical groups from Los Angeles
Ruthless Records artists
Black Eyed Peas